The following list includes all of the Canadian Register of Historic Places listings in Nanaimo Regional District, British Columbia.

See also
List of coal mines and landmarks in the Nanaimo area

References
(references appear in the table above as external links)

Nanaimo Regional District